Aliiroseovarius zhejiangensis is a Gram-negative, aerobic, rod-shaped and non-motile bacterium from the genus of Aliiroseovarius which has been isolated from wastewater from a Haiyan fine chemical factory from Zhejiang in China.

References 

Rhodobacteraceae
Bacteria described in 2015